The 1947 Normanton by-election was a parliamentary by-election held for the British House of Commons constituency of Normanton on 11 February 1947.  The seat had become vacant when the Labour Member of Parliament Tom Smith had resigned, take up the post of Labour Director of the North-Eastern Divisional Coal Board.  Smith had held the seat since the by-election in 1933.

The Labour candidate, George Sylvester, held the seat for his party. The Conservative Party candidate was Enoch Powell, the first time he had stood for election, but he was heavily defeated.

See also
Normanton (UK Parliament constituency)
1904 Normanton by-election
1905 Normanton by-election
1933 Normanton by-election
List of United Kingdom by-elections

References 

 
 

Normanton, 1947
Normanton by-election
Normanton by-election
Normanton by-election
Normanton by-election, 1947
Normanton by-election, 1947